Six-Gun Trail is a 1938 American Western film directed by Sam Newfield.

Cast
Tim McCoy as Capt. William 'Lightning Bill' Carson 
Nora Lane as Midge
Ben Corbett as Magpie
Alden Stephen Chase as Jim Wilson
Ted Adams as Spokesman
Donald Gallaher as Henchman Tracy (Mac in credits)
Bob Terry as Henchman Mac (Tracy in credits)
Karl Hackett as Joe Willis
Frank Wayne as Messenger
Hal Carey as Singer

Soundtrack
Hal Carey - "A Cowboy Sings a Lullaby" (Written by Johnny Lange and Lew Porter)
Hal Carey - "Moon Over the Plains" (Written by Johnny Lange and Lew Porter)

References

External links
 

1938 films
1938 Western (genre) films
1930s English-language films
American black-and-white films
American Western (genre) films
Films directed by Sam Newfield
1930s American films